Vaijanath Basappa Biradar is an Indian comedian and actor who works in Kannada cinema. He has acted nearly 500 movies in Kannada.

He was awarded the top one best actor in the 2011 India Imagine film festival that took place in Madrid, Spain for his performance in the Kannada film Kanasemba Kudureyaneri directed by Girish Kasaravalli in 2010.

Personal life
Vaijanath Biradar was born on 1952 June 26 to Kailash patil and Nagamma in the village called Tegampur in Bhalki taluk of Bidar district of northern Karnataka.

Films
Some of the movies where he acted include Kashinath's film Love Training, and Jaggesh starring Mata, Aliya Alla Magala Ganda, Ramesh Arvind starring O Mallige, Dr. B. R. Ambedkar (2005) are some of the well known movies acted by Vaijanath Biradar. He has also appeared in Tulu film Soombe.

References

External links
 
 Life story of Vaijanath Biradar

Male actors in Kannada cinema
Indian male film actors
Living people
People from Bidar
21st-century Indian male actors
Male actors from Karnataka
Recipients of the Rajyotsava Award 2014
1952 births